The 2022 Presidents Cup was the 14th edition of the Presidents Cup golf competition, held at Quail Hollow Club in Charlotte, North Carolina, from September 22–25, 2022. This was Quail Hollow's first time hosting the Presidents Cup. The matches were originally scheduled for fall 2021. The USA won the competition and retained the cup.

Team qualification and selection
Both teams have 12 players.

United States team
The United States team features the six players who have earned the most FedEx Cup points from the 2019 A Military Tribute at the Greenbrier through the 2022 BMW Championship. Six captain's picks were made on 7 September 2022.

The final standings were:

International team
The International Team qualification period ran from the 2021 Open Championship through the 2022 BMW Championship. The team was to be composed of the top eight players from the Presidents Cup International Team Points List, which is based on the Official World Golf Ranking, and four captain's picks. With Cameron Smith and Joaquín Niemann (numbers 1 and 4 in the final standings) being excluded having joined LIV Golf, their selections were converted to additional captain's picks. Immelman announced his six selections on 6 September 2022.

The final standings were:

Notes 

Zalatoris was unavailable for selection as a captain's pick due to a back injury.
Smith and Niemann were automatic selections but were banned from competing after joining LIV Golf.
Lahiri and Leishman were unable to be selected as a captain's pick after joining LIV Golf.

Teams

Captains
Davis Love III captained the U.S. team, and Trevor Immelman captained the International team.

Love announced that Fred Couples and Zach Johnson will be two of his assistants. Love announced Steve Stricker and Webb Simpson as his final two assistant captains. Immelman announced that K. J. Choi, Geoff Ogilvy, Camilo Villegas, and Mike Weir would be his assistants.

Players

Captain's picks shown in yellow
Ages as of 19 September; OWGR as of 18 September, the last ranking before the Cup

Thursday's foursomes matches

Friday's fourball matches

Saturday's matches

Morning foursomes

Afternoon fourball

Sunday's singles matches

Individual player records
Each entry refers to the Win–Loss–Tie record of the player.

United States

International

References

External links

Presidents Cup
Golf in North Carolina
Presidents Cup
Presidents Cup
Presidents Cup
Presidents Cup